Gunnar Fredrik Berndtson (24 October 1854, Helsinki – 9 April 1895, Helsinki) was a Finnish painter who was noted for his attention to realistic detail.

Biography

He began his higher studies at the Polytechnic Institute (now the Helsinki University of Technology). Since 1869, however, he had been associating with members of the Academy of Fine Arts and was auditing art classes at the University of Helsinki taught by Erik Johan Löfgren and others.

By 1876, he had made the decision to be an artist, so he went to Paris, where he enrolled at the École des Beaux-Arts and studied under Jean-Léon Gérôme. He remained there until 1882. During his stay, he became part of a group centered around Albert Edelfelt and was influenced by the Salon style of painting. His first exhibit at the Salon came in 1878.

From 1882 to 1883, he visited Egypt as the guest of Alphonse, Baron Delort de Gléon (1843-1899), a mining engineer. He settled in the French community there, painting portraits and providing illustrations, as a correspondent, for Le Monde illustré. Three years after his return to Finland, he got married. In 1889, he received the State Prize for portrait painting.

He frequently returned to Paris to exhibit at the Salon, where he had always had his greatest successes. From 1890 to 1892, he was a teacher at the Academy of Fine Arts, where Magnus Enckell was among his best-known students. Others included Ellen Thesleff and Beda Stjernschantz.

Berndtson died in 1895 of a "degenerative ailment"; possibly syphilis. He is buried in the Hietaniemi Cemetery in Helsinki.

Works

See also
 Golden Age of Finnish Art
 Art in Finland

References

Further reading
Berndt Arell, Christian Hoffman: Gunnar Berndtson, Salonkimaalari, Turun Taidemuseo, Pohjoinen, 1998 
Maria Vainio-Kurtakko, Idyll eller verklighet?: Albert Edelfelt och Gunnar Berndtson i det moderna genombrottets ambivalens (Idyll or Reality?) Finska fornminnesförening, 2010

External links

ArtNet: More works by Berndtson
Appreciation @ Finska (blog, in Croatian)

1854 births
1895 deaths
Artists from Helsinki
People from Uusimaa Province (Grand Duchy of Finland)
Genre painters
Swedish-speaking Finns
19th-century Finnish painters
Burials at Hietaniemi Cemetery
Finnish male painters
19th-century Finnish male artists